is an action role-playing hack and slash video game developed by Omega Force and published by Koei Tecmo in Japan and Nintendo internationally for the Nintendo Switch. Part of the Fire Emblem series created by Intelligent Systems, it is both a spin-off of Fire Emblem: Three Houses (2019) and a successor to Fire Emblem Warriors (2017), similarly acting as a crossover between the mechanics of Fire Emblem and the Warriors franchise owned by Koei Tecmo (which Omega Force is a division of). The game was announced in a Nintendo Direct on February 9, 2022, and was released worldwide on June 24, 2022.

Three Hopes is set in the same universe as Three Houses; although characters and story elements from the original game (including the Cindered Shadows DLC) are heavily featured, it takes place in an alternative timeline and features a new character named Shez as its protagonist. In Three Hopes, Shez, a mercenary whose team was decimated by Byleth in battle, joins the military academy of Garreg Mach Monastery and becomes a student in one of three classes, each including students from one of the three nations of the continent of Fódlan. Like in Three Houses, the game allows players to decide which class to join, leading to different story paths and playable characters.

Gameplay 

Much like its predecessor, Fire Emblem Warriors: Three Hopes is a hack-and-slash action role-playing game with gameplay similar to the Dynasty Warriors series. Players will control characters from Fire Emblem: Three Houses including Edelgard, Dimitri, Claude, and a new character, Shez, who like most avatars in the Fire Emblem series, can be either male or female.

Plot 
The game takes place on the continent of Fódlan in an alternative timeline to that of Fire Emblem: Three Houses. In the tradition of Three Houses, the game has three unique storylines: Scarlet Blaze, Azure Gleam, and Golden Wildfire, each following one of the three house leaders. It diverges from the storyline of its predecessor game in that Byleth, the playable character of Fire Emblem: Three Houses, serves as an antagonist. Three Hopes introduces several new characters to fight alongside the cast of Three Houses, including Shez, a mercenary Byleth previously encountered, and Arval, a mysterious white-robed being who opposes Sothis in the game's cover art.

Synopsis 
The mercenary Shez is defeated in battle by the Ashen Demon Byleth, vessel of the progenitor god Sothis, and their father Jeralt; Shez only survives due to the intervention of a mysterious being named Arval and swears revenge. Six months later, Shez rescues three nobles from a bandit attack: Edelgard von Hresvelg, princess of the Adrestian Empire, Dimitri Alexandre Blaiddyd, prince of the Holy Kingdom of Faerghus, and Claude von Riegan, heir to the leading house of the Leicester Alliance. As a reward, Archbishop Rhea of the Church of Seiros allows Shez to enroll in the Officer's Academy, an elite military academy for Fódlan's brightest students. Shez and their classmates rescue Monica, a former student who was abducted by "Those Who Slither in the Dark", a fanatical cult that seeks to conquer Fódlan. Afterward, the three lords are forced to depart the Academy when a crisis strikes their homelands. Edelgard launches a coup to overthrow Thales, the leader of Those Who Slither in the Dark who has taken effective control of the Empire; Dimitri suppresses a coup launched by his uncle and regent Rufus; and Claude defends Leicester's eastern border from an invasion by Shahid, an avaricious prince of the eastern kingdom of Almyra and Claude's half-brother. Shez accompanies their chosen lord and remains in their service for the next two years. All three lords are crowned leaders of their respective countries. Two years later, Edelgard declares war on the Church of Seiros, believing it to be corrupt.

Scarlet Blaze 
Edelgard and her forces claim Garreg Mach for the Empire, forcing the Church of Seiros to seek aid from the Kingdom. The Empire manages to hold back troops from the Kingdom and Alliance to secure key locations in the west and east. Months later, Edelgard and Claude form a pact for the Empire and Alliance to work together to defeat the Kingdom and Church of Seiros. As their forces begin to surround the Kingdom, many Adrestrian territories are suddenly attacked by "Those Who Slither in the Dark" and a revolt led by Duke Aegir. Edelgard's army slays Duke Aegir and contains most of the chaos before advancing back to the Kingdom. While the Empire and Alliance fight the Kingdom and Church of Seiros in the north, Rhea uses a secret passage and leads her soldiers to reclaim Garreg Mach, which is also approached by Thales and "Those Who Slither in the Dark". Edelgard's forces manage to hold back both armies until Rhea and Thales seemingly kill each other. With their absences, the influence of the Central Church wanes, and "Those Who Slither in the Dark" vanish.

There are two endings to this route that are determined by Shez deciding to recruit or kill Jeralt and Byleth. If they kill Jeralt, Byleth joins Claude and encourages him to break the pact with the Empire during the battle with the Kingdom and Church in the north; Claude's forces are defeated in a three-way battle, which causes all three ruling powers of Fódlan to return to war against each other with no end in sight. If they are recruited, Claude maintains the pact, and the Empire and Alliance prepare for their final battle with the Kingdom to bring an end to the war.

Azure Gleam 
Dimitri chooses to provide asylum to the Church of Seiros and go to war against the Empire. As they attempt to reclaim western territories, they face a revolt from the traitorous former royal family mage Cornelia and the western lords. After they defeat her, Cornelia tells Dimitri that his stepmother, Edelgard's mother, was involved in the Tragedy of Duscur and encourages him to seek answers from Edelgard before dying. The Kingdom and the Empire face off in Arianhrod, with the Kingdom emerging victorious. Before Dimitri can kill Edelgard, Thales appears and attacks both of them. Edelgard reveals that he was responsible for the death of Dimitri's father before he uses his magic to subdue and put her under his control. With the Empire becoming more chaotic under Thales and Duke Aegir's leadership, Claude and Dimitri form a partnership so the combined forces of Leicester, Faerghus, and the Church of Seiros can take down Adrestia. After splitting up the Empire's western and eastern forces, Dimitri and his army successfully kill Duke Aegir and Thales and free Edelgard from Thales's mind control. This forces Adrestria back on all fronts and radically transforms the power structure throughout Fódlan as the allied forces press south to crush the Empire for good.

Golden Wildfire 
Claude initially opposes Edelgard in defense of Leicester. However, an attempt to counter invade the Empire is interrupted when Shahid launches another attack on the Alliance, forcing Claude to break his momentum against Adrestia to repel and kill Shahid. Claude negotiates a ceasefire with Edelgard. Four months later, the Alliance is reformed as the Leicester Federation, with Claude as its first king. Claude, who agrees with Edelgard's belief that the Rhea is stagnating Fódlan, sets out to kill Rhea and cripple the Church's military and political power. Claude drives Dimitri to the capital of Faerghus but is forced to back down when those who slither in the dark incite civil unrest in Leicester. The Empire and Federation defeat the Kingdom and Church in battle, leading Dimitri to abandon the Church to protect Faerghus, allowing Claude and Shez to battle and kill Rhea. With his goal complete, Claude proposes an end to the war, although it is uncertain whether his words will be heeded.

Secret Chapters 
In all three routes, Byleth and Jeralt are hired by factions opposed to Shez and hinder them throughout the war. If Shez kills Jeralt in battle, Byleth swears revenge and sacrifices their mortal body to Sothis. Sothis attacks Shez, but she and Byleth are killed in the ensuing battle, leaving Shez with regrets. If Shez convinces Byleth and Jeralt to surrender, the two are hired by Shez's faction. Shortly before the final battle, Arval possesses Shez and attempts to kill Byleth. When Shez's allies intervene, Arval banishes them, Edelgard, Dimitri, and Claude to another dimension using the Forbidden Spell of Zaharas. Arval is revealed to be the vessel for the soul of Epimenides, a powerful member of "Those Who Slither in the Dark" bent on killing Sothis. Shez and the three lords kill Epimenides and return to their world to continue the war.

Release 
The title was initially revealed at a Nintendo Direct held on February 9, 2022 with a trailer revealing only the returns of Byleth, Edelgard, Dimitri, and Claude. On April 12, 2022, a trailer titled "Mysterious Mercenary" was released, announcing that Byleth would serve as an antagonist, Shez would be a new protagonist of selectable gender, Hubert, Dedue, and Hilda would be playable characters, and that the game would feature three diverging paths, similar to Three Houses. Over the course of May 2022, three trailers were released focusing on the Black Eagles, Blue Lions, and Golden Deer respectively, with each revealing updated designs for all of the students from Three Houses. A final trailer was released on June 8, 2022 confirming the return of the Ashen Wolves characters from the Cindered Shadows DLC story in Three Houses. After the trailer was posted, a demo was released on the Nintendo eShop later that day, which allowed progression up to Chapter 4.

Three Hopes, along with AI: The Somnium Files - Nirvana Initiative, were the final video games to feature the voicework of Billy Kametz, who died of colon cancer on June 9, 2022. Both games were released just 2 weeks after his death.

Reception

Pre-release 
Eurogamer, playing the demo, felt the game was "a significant improvement over the first Fire Emblem Warriors", citing deeper strategy and more polish. VG247 and Nintendo Life also praised the demo, calling it "the most fun [they've] had with a Nintendo Musou since the original Hyrule Warriors" and "set to improve everything about its predecessor", respectively.

Critical response 

Fire Emblem Warriors: Three Hopes received an aggregate score of 81/100 on Metacritic, indicating "generally favorable" reviews. While critics felt that Three Hopes improved upon its predecessor with good performance and increased depth and appealed to fans of the Warriors games, they noted that it would fail to compel those who did not favor its signature hack and slash gameplay.

Destructoid lauded the title's incorporation of tension and technical nuance seen in the warp mechanic, micro-narratives, and last-second enemy ambushes, but concluded by stating, "There's flashes of mechanical brilliance in Three Hopes, that show how the game's combat could have further differentiated itself from the games before it; but [developer] Omega Force doesn't fully commit." Eurogamer recommended the title, calling it "an inventive twist on...the musou formula" and "a high point for the genre", while praising the satisfying exploration incentives, addition of strategy resources, and strategic gameplay elements. Game Informer said that the game was "a blast to play and packs a story just as thrilling as Three Houses" and praised the enemy variety, character interactions, and highly engaging narrative, but took issue with the subpar visuals, poor pacing, and late-game twists that lacked impact.

GameSpot liked the addition of mid-battle fast-travel options, effective character development, and noted that it ran "surprisingly well with fast load times compared to past Musou games", but was critical of the "staggering amount of tutorials", unengaging political narrative, and bad placement of checkpoints. GamesRadar+ criticized the sidelining of the cast of characters from Three Houses but appreciated its influence on the gameplay of Three Hopes, writing, "Fire Emblem Warriors: Three Hopes almost pulls off what should be an audacious crossover – frantic large-scale, Dynasty Warriors-style battles with some of the tactical depth which made Fire Emblem so famous." IGN similarly wrote in favor of the game but disliked its pacing, stating, "Three Hopes packs in too much filler even when you ignore everything optional, leading to some obnoxious repetition over the course of its 25-ish hours." Nintendo Life gave high praise to the improvements made to the story, performance, tactical depth, replayability, and relationship building upon previous titles but noted that the game faltered in terms of its pacing and occasional slowdown.

Sales 
Fire Emblem Warriors: Three Hopes sold 97,538 physical copies within its first week of release in Japan, making it the bestselling retail game of the week in the country. The game also topped the weekly sales chart upon release in South Korea, Taiwan, and the United Kingdom.

Within two months of release, the game had shipped over 1 million units worldwide.

Notes

References 

2022 video games
Warriors: Three Hopes
Multiplayer and single-player video games
Nintendo Switch games
Nintendo Switch-only games
Omega Force games
Real-time tactics video games
Tactical role-playing video games
Video games developed in Japan
Video games featuring protagonists of selectable gender
Video games that use Amiibo figurines
Video games with alternate endings
War video games
Warriors (video game series)